Cavall (Middle  RBH & WBR; modernized: Cafall; ; , var. Caball (ms.K)) was King Arthur's dog, used in the hunt for the great boar, Twrch Trwyth.

Cavall was Arthur's "favourite dog", and during a stag hunt, he was customarily the last dog to be let loose to chase after the game (Gereint Son of Erbin).

Historia Brittonum

Legend in antiquity has it that Cabal left his permanent footprint in the rock while pursuing the boar Troynt.  The lore is preserved in the Wonders of Britain (De Mirabilibus Britanniae or Mirabilia in shorthand) appended to Historia Brittonum (9th century). The wondrous nature of this cairn of stones was that even if someone removed that foot-printed stone to another spot, it would be back at its original heap the next day.

Culhwch ac Olwen

Unlike the simple primitive lore, the late Welsh romance Culhwch and Olwen weaves a much more intricate tale, naming many dogs besides Cavall in the hunting party, and the quarry is no longer just the boar Twrch Trwyth itself, its seven offspring (with names), and yet another boar named Yskithyrwyn besides.

Ysgithyrwyn Chief-Boar
Yskithyrwyn Penbaedd (or Ysgithyrwyn Chief Boar) was yet another boar to be hunted by Arthur's band; its tusk, which needed to be extracted while still alive, being another of the "impossible tasks" (anoeth; pl. anoethiau) prescribed by Ysbaddaden Chief-Giant.  This tusk was the tool necessary for shaving the giant to groom him up, him being the father of the bride Olwen.

In Culhwch and Olwen, Arthur's dog Cavall is specifically credited with the slaying of Yskithyrwin (or at least with cornering the beast to its doom). Caw of Prydain who rides Arthur's mare Llamrei cleaves Yskithyrwyn's head with a hatchet.

Afterwards, "Bedwyr leading Cavall, Arthur's own dog", joins the other hunters and dogs to pursue the great boar Twrch Trwyth and its piglets. But the specific role played by Cavall is not told.

List of dogs
The other hounds, which either belonged to Arthur's retinue or were recruited elsewhere, include:
 The two (wolf?) cubs of Gast Rhymhi (two whelps of the bitch Rhymhi), named Gwyddrud and Gwyddneu Astrus.
 Aned and Aethelm.
 Glas, Glessic, and Gleisad (Glesig, Gleisad), belonging to the three sons of Cleddyf Kyfwlch, named Bwlch,  Kyfwlch, and Sefwlch.
 Drudwyn, the cub of Greid the son of Eri.
 two dogs of Glythmyr Ledewic (Glythfyr Ledewig).

Cavall the horse
Glas, Glesig, and Gleisad are referred to as dogs, and Call, Cuall, and Cafall as horses, and so on down the line, in the list of belongings of sons of Cleddyf, or, at least they are nowadays in modern translations. However, in the first English translation by Lady Guest, Glas, etc. were construed as sword names and Call, Cuall, Cavall as dogs, respectively.

Etymology
Ifor Williams has made a study of occurrences of Cafall in old Welsh poetry.

A number of scholars seem to hit upon the similarity of the dog's name to the Latin word for "horse". In an article from 1936, R. J. Thomas said that "the name Cabal is from Latin caballus 'horse', which he considers a quite natural metaphor since the dog was strong and swift, and he compares the horse of Conall Cernach which had a dog's head".

Bromwich further remarks, "Since carn means both 'hoof' and 'cairn' it seems more probable that Cabal/Cafall originally designated Arthur horse.. rather than his hound".

See also
Husdent
Hengroen

Explanatory notes

References
Citations

Bibliography

{{wikisource|1=The Mabinogion/Kilhwch and Olwen|2=Kilhwch and Olwen}}

: Geraint ab Erbin Welsh, p. 4; English, p. 67. Kilhwch ac Olwen'' Welsh, p. 195; English, p. 249.
 
 (Revised edition 1993; Indexed 1989; first published Everyman Library 1949)

 

Mythological dogs
Welsh mythology
Arthurian characters
Dogs in literature